DAFS may refer to:
 Damage Analysis and Fundamental Studies, a program of the United States Department of Energy that studies radiation damage
 Direct Access File System, a network file system that uses remote direct memory access to perform efficient network access to data in remote files
 Direct Aerial Fire Support, a term describing helicopter combat support
 Diffraction Anomalous Fine Structure, an X-ray technique for determining atomic structure
 Document Attribute Format Specification, an interchange format representing document structure

See also
 DAF (disambiguation)